This is a list of lighthouses in South Africa. It contains currently active lights as well as decommissioned lights of historical importance.

Lighthouses

See also
List of lighthouses in Namibia (to the north-west)
List of lighthouses in Mozambique (to the north-east)
List of lighthouses and lightvessels
Transnet National Ports Authority
List of shipwrecks in South Africa

Gallery

References

External links

Baillie-Cooper, Simon (2006-07-23) Lighthouses of South Africa
Lighthouse Map and Light Characteristics: Lighthouses, South Africa

 
South Africa
Lighthouses
Lighthouses
Lighthouses